Christine Clara Truman Janes  (born 16 January 1941) is a former tennis player from the United Kingdom who was active from the mid-1950s to the mid-1970s. She won a singles Grand Slam title at the French Championships in 1959 and was a finalist at Wimbledon and the U.S. Championships. She helped Great Britain win the Wightman Cup in 1958, 1960 and 1968.

Career
Christine Truman was a member of a tight-knit, supportive tennis-playing family. She often entered the Wimbledon mixed doubles with her brother Humphrey. She formed a successful doubles partnership with her younger sister Nell Truman. She was the British junior champion in 1956 and 1957. Truman made her debut at Wimbledon in 1957 at age 16, beating the third seed and then French Open champion Shirley Bloomer, American semifinalist Betty Rosenquest, and eventually lost to eventual champion Althea Gibson in the semifinals.

In 1958, she caused a sensation by defeating Gibson, the reigning Wimbledon champion, in the Wightman Cup and helped bring the cup back to Great Britain after 21 consecutive defeats by the United States. She also beat Dorothy Knode and won her doubles with Shirley Bloomer. A few weeks later at Wimbledon, however, as the second seed she was defeated in the fourth round by the American Mimi Arnold. This loss helped start her reputation as an unpredictable player.

In 1959, she became the youngest women's singles champion at the French Championships at the age of 18, beating Sandra Reynolds in three sets and defending champion Zsuzsa Körmöczy in straight sets in the final. That year, by far her best, also saw her as the winner of the Italian Championships, beating Yola Ramirez and, in an astonishing final, Sandra Reynolds by 6–0, 6–1. In 1959, she also was runner-up at the U.S. Championships to Maria Bueno after beating Dorothy Knode and Ann Haydon. She failed, however, to justify her top seeding at Wimbledon where she lost in the fourth round to Yola Ramírez. In doubles at Wimbledon, Truman partnered Beverly Baker to reach the women's doubles final (where they lost to Darlene Hard and Jeanne Arth).

In 1960, she was the third seed at Wimbledon, where she lost the semifinal to Maria Bueno in three sets. She also lost to Bueno in the semifinals of the U.S. Open. She teamed with Bueno to win the women's doubles title at the Australian Championships that year. She won the British Hard Courts championships by beating Angela Mortimer 6–2, 2–6, 6–2 and Ann Haydon 6–2, 6–2. She also won Queen's, beating the future Wimbledon winner Karen Hantze 6–4, 6–3.

In 1961, she was the sixth seed at Wimbledon and defeated the second seed Margaret Smith 3–6, 6–3, 9–7 in a quarterfinal after trailing 4–1 in the final set and saving two match points. She then beat Renee Schuurman in the semifinal 6–4, 6–4 before losing to fellow Briton Angela Mortimer in the final. During this match, Truman suffered a heavy fall that may have cost her the match.

In July 1962 it was revealed that Truman is partially blind in her left eye. After a poor year in 1962, she came back in 1963 to reach the semifinals of the French and quarterfinals of the U.S. Open, losing in three sets to Margaret Smith. She also won Monte Carlo in 1964 beating top ten players Helga Schultze, Vera Sukova, and Jan Lehane and the South African championships in 1965, beating Francoise Durr 6–2, 6–4 and Annette Van Zyl 6–2, 6–3. She also won the doubles with Margaret Hunt Price.

Truman had another comparatively successful Wimbledon run in 1965, when unseeded, she defeated sixth-seeded Carole Caldwell Graebner, Judy Tegart, Julie Heldman, and fourth-seeded Nancy Richey. Her run to the semi-final held some irony as it was the first time in Wimbledon history that no British player had been seeded in the women's championship. She was defeated by no. 2 seed (and eventual champion) Margaret Smith in the semi-final 6–4, 6–0. She had been affected by injury and illness in 1961, 1964, and 1965. In 1965, during practice for the Wightman Cup, Truman severely hurt her Achilles tendon  for the second time, and this injury led to an 18-month gap in her career. After this injury, she was not ranked again in the world's top ten again.

In April 1968, she and her sister Nell Truman became the first winners of an open tennis event by winning the women's doubles title at the British Hard Court Championships in Bournemouth.

Her tennis was an all-attack game, reaching the net at the earliest possibility. She had a tremendously strong, flat forehand, balanced with a sliced backhand, excellent volleys and smash, and hard serve.

During her career, Truman had wins over most of the other leading players of her day, including Althea Gibson (Wightman Cup 1958); Maria Bueno (Pacific Coast 1958 and Caribbean 1959); Darlene Hard several times, notably in the Wightman Cup in 1959; British rivals Angela Mortimer, Ann Haydon, Shirley Bloomer Brasher, all on several occasions; Zsuszi Kormoczy, Margaret Smith, Billie Jean Moffitt, Sandra Reynolds, Karen Hantze, and Lesley Turner. According to Lance Tingay, Truman was ranked in the world top 10 from 1957 to 1961 as well as 1965, and she reached a career high ranking of world no. 2 in 1959.

In December 1967, she married former Wasps player Gerry Janes and they have four children, including former pro tennis player Amanda Keen. She retired from tennis in 1975 and became a commentator for BBC Radio the same year. In the 2001 Birthday Honours, she was appointed a Member of the Order of the British Empire (MBE) for services to lawn tennis. Since 2011 she has published several children's books.

Grand Slam  finals

Singles: 3 (1 title, 2 runners-up)

Doubles: 2 (1 title, 1 runner-up)

Grand Slam singles tournament timeline

See also
 Performance timelines for all female tennis players who reached at least one Grand Slam final

Notes

References

External links
 
 
 

1941 births
Living people
Australian Championships (tennis) champions
English female tennis players
English sports broadcasters
French Championships (tennis) champions
People from Woodford, London
Tennis commentators
Grand Slam (tennis) champions in women's singles
Grand Slam (tennis) champions in women's doubles
Members of the Order of the British Empire
English children's writers
Tennis people from Essex
People from Loughton